Hockey Club Saryarka, commonly referred as Saryarka Karagandy, is a professional ice hockey team based in Karagandy, Kazakhstan. They Currently play in the Kazakhstan Hockey Championship.

History
Saryarka was formed on 25 July 2006 by the Karagandy Region Municipality and Regional Department of Physical Culture and Sports. The team name "Saryarka" comes from given name of the territory located in the central part of Kazakhstan.

Season-by-season record 
This is a partial list of the last five seasons completed by Saryarka Karagandy. For the full season-by-season history, see List of Saryarka Karagandy seasons.

Note: GP = Games played, W = Wins, L = Losses, OTW = Overtime/shootout wins, OTL = Overtime/shootout losses, Pts = Points, GF = Goals for, GA = Goals against

Achievements 
Bratina Cup
 Winner (1) 2014, 2019

Kazakhstan Hockey Championship:
 Winner (3): 2009–10, 2020–21, 2021–22 
 3rd place (2): 2010–11, 2011–12

Pervaya Liga – Siberia and Far East Zone
 Winner (1): 2007–08

Leaders

Team captains
Maxim Orlov 2011–12
Pavel Kanarsky 2012–13
Jan Homer 2013–14
Alexander Vasiliev 2014–15
Maxim Belyaev 2015-16
Smolyaninov Vitaly 2016-17
Ilya Antonovsky 2016-present

Head coaches
Galym Mambetaliyev 2006–08
Valeri Tushentsov 2008–09
Oleg Bolyakin 2009–11
Andrei Kirdyashov 2011–13
Evgeni Zinoviev 2013
Dusan Gregor 2013–14
Alexei Fetisov 2014
Leonids Tambijevs 2014–15
Andrei Potaichuk 2015
Vadim Epanchintsev 2015-17
 Aleksandr Sokolov 2017
 Dmitry Kramarenko 2017–present

References

External links
  

 
Ice hockey teams in Kazakhstan
Sport in Karaganda
Ice hockey clubs established in 2006
2006 establishments in Kazakhstan